Ram Vishnun Singh also known as Lohiya Ji and popularly called as Ram Vishaun Yadav is an Indian politician. He was elected to the Bihar Legislative Assembly from Jagdishpur (Vidhan Sabha constituency) as the 2015 Member of Bihar Legislative Assembly as a member of the Rashtriya Janata Dal.

References

Rashtriya Janata Dal politicians
Bihar MLAs 2020–2025
Bihar MLAs 2015–2020
People from Arrah
1954 births
Living people